China Eastern Airlines Flight 5398 (MU5398) was a flight route from Shenzhen's Bao'an International Airport to Fuzhou Yixu Airport in Fujian. On 26 October 1993, a McDonnell Douglas MD-82 airliner flying this route crashed on approach to Fuzhou Yixu Airport. The aircraft overran the runway while landing in heavy rain and high winds. Two of the 80 passengers and crew on board were killed.

Event summary
On October 26, 1993, 11:50am, Flight MU5398 took off from Shenzhen airport and scheduled to land 12:50pm at Fuzhou airport. At 12:32pm, the crew contacted tower in Fuzhou airport preparing for landing. It was raining at the time, and the visibility was 4 km. The crew began the approach despite the poor visibility, resulting in a severe deviation to the right of the runway. The crew did not abort the landing and initiate a go-around, but tried to correct the course while continuing to descend. The aircraft kept losing altitude, and its tail struck the runway before the aircraft overran and stopped at a pond. The fuselage broke into 3 pieces. Two people were killed and ten more injured.

Later investigation revealed that the crew of Flight MU5398 violated the approaching protocol at Fuzhou airport, and did not cooperate well with the air traffic controller. The cause of the accident was ruled to be pilot error.

After the event
China Eastern Airlines continues to use Flight number MU5398, but it has changed to the route from Chongqing Jiangbei International Airport to Shanghai Pudong International Airport via Wenzhou Longwan International Airport, served by the Boeing 737.

Fuzhou Yixu Airport was built in 1944 as a military airport. From 1974 it served for both civilian and military use, and was served by many domestic and international airlines. Due to the runway length and the increasing air traffic, a new civilian airport was proposed in 1991. On June 23, 1997, Fuzhou Changle International Airport opened for operation. Fuzhou Yixu Airport returned to military use only.

Registration number B-2103 was later assigned to a McDonnell Douglas MD-90 aircraft in 2000, operated by China Northern Airlines. It continued to operate for China Southern Airlines when China Northern merged with China Southern in 2002. In November 2010, this MD-90 was sold to Delta Air Lines as N965DN. It continued to operate with Delta Air Lines until July 2018, when the aircraft was 
then withdrawn from use and stored at San Bernardino International Airport. It was eventually broken up in 2020.

See also
 List of accidents and incidents involving commercial aircraft

References

1993 disasters in China
Accidents and incidents involving the McDonnell Douglas MD-82
Aviation accidents and incidents in 1993
Aviation accidents and incidents in China
Airliner accidents and incidents caused by pilot error
History of Fujian
Airliner accidents and incidents involving runway overruns
5398
October 1993 events in Asia